A 2023 Tour Card is needed to compete in Professional Darts Corporation ProTour tournaments.

In total 128 players are granted Tour Cards, which enables them to participate in all Players Championships and European Tour Qualifiers.

Most Tour Cards are valid for 2 years. The top 64 in the PDC Order of Merit all receive Tour Cards automatically, and those who won a two-year card in 2022 still have a valid card for 2023. The top player from the European and UK branches of the 2022 Challenge Tour and Development Tour received cards automatically. The remaining places were awarded at the 2023 Q-Schools, with the final four days of competition awarding two Tour Cards per day from the UK Q-School and one a day from the European Q-School; with the remaining players being ranked and the top players also receiving Tour Cards. All players who won a card at either Q-School have their Order of Merit ranking reset to zero.

Tour Cards per Nation

References 
 

2023 PDC Pro Tour
2023 in darts
Lists of darts players